The School of Engineering of Terrassa, is one of the schools of the Universitat Politècnica de Catalunya (UPC), a public university located in Spain.

The school itself is located in Terrassa (province of Barcelona). It offers 8 degree programs and currently there are 1.500 students enrolled.

EET is located in the Terrassa Campus of the UPC.

Degrees 
Degrees offered at EET are adjusted to the European Higher Education Area (EHEA) and cover different knowledge areas:

Industrial Engineering:
Bachelor's degree in Electrical Engineering
Bachelor's degree in Industrial Electronic and Automatic Control Engineering
Bachelor's degree in Mechanical Engineering
Bachelor's degree in Chemical Engineering
Bachelor's degree in Textile Technology and Design Engineering
Bachelor's degree in Industrial Design Product Development Engineering
Telecommunication Engineering:
Bachelor's degree in Audiovisual Systems Engineering
Masters:
Master's degree in Textile, Paper and Graphic Engineering

History

The activity in the School of Engineering of Terrassa started in August 1901 and the teaching in February 1902. At the beginning it was known as the Escuela Superior de Industrias de Tarrassa (High Industrial School of Terrassa) where the following areas were taught: Engineering, Practical Engineering and elementary education for workers.

Originally the school was founded to cover the needs of the Textile Industry of Terrassa. This industry reached the peak of its development in the 19th Century with the arrival of the steam engine and the new mechanical looms.

Initially it was located in Topete Street-4 and in July 1904 it was moved to its current address, Colom Street-1, where it took place the inauguration of this Catalan modernist building that gave a proud distinction to the city of Terrassa. This work of art was a construction of the architect Lluís Muncunill Parellada. An exhibition celebrated during that year represented the most culminating moment of the applied arts. In 1943 the building became property of the Government and kept its teaching function.

The Textile Engineering teaching has been a characteristic of The School of Engineering of Terrassa, offered since 1906 and now adapted to the new degrees. Other fields of engineering were also taught in the school: Chemical, Mechanics, Electrical and Electronics.

In 1962 the field of Engineering was separated from the field of Higher Education and the teaching activity started at the Escuela Técnica Superior de Ingenieros Industriales (Technical High School of Industrial Engineering), in Colom Street-1.

In 1972 the school started to be part of the Universitat Politècnica de Barcelona, which afterwards became into Universitat Politecnica de Catalunya (UPC).

A modernist building 

The Industrial School is one of the first works of Lluís Muncunill and it was characterized by the influence of a historicist style. It is an isolated 2-floor building with ground floor and U-shaped that surrounds a patio.

The main hall, that gives direct access to the classrooms, the library and other rooms, is supported by steel columns and there is a bust of the founder of the school, Alfonso Salonsa. The main facade is notable for the stairs in the principal entrance and both lateral sections. According to the project of Josep Domènech i Mansana, two perpendicular naves were added to the ends of the original building that had the initial use of workshops.

Location 

EET is formed by TR1 (main building), TR2 (back building) and TR3 (lateral nave) of the Campus of Terrassa, and the main entrance of TR1 is located in Colom Street-1.

The Campus of the Universitat Politècnica de Catalunya is located in Terrassa downtown. It has good transport connection with Barcelona city and its metropolitan area (local trains of RENFE, FFCC, and the city bus network).

The Campus academic activity consists of undergraduate (degrees), postgraduate (masters) and doctorate programmes. At present there are more than 5000 students enrolled and it is considered as one of the most important universities in Catalunya.

External links 
 Official web site of EET
 Official web site of Campus Terrassa
 Official web site of UPC

Polytechnic University of Catalonia
Engineering universities and colleges in Spain
Terrassa